Jordan Norberto Vallenilla (born December 8, 1986) is a Dominican former professional baseball pitcher. He previously played in Major League Baseball for the Arizona Diamondbacks and Oakland Athletics, and in the Nippon Professional Baseball League for the Chunichi Dragons and Tokyo Yakult Swallows.

Professional career

Arizona Diamondbacks
Norberto made the Diamondbacks Opening Day roster in 2010.

Oakland Athletics

On July 31, 2011, Norberto was traded to the Oakland Athletics with Brandon Allen for Brad Ziegler. He made the Oakland Athletics Opening Day bullpen in 2012. He missed two portions of the season on the disabled list with shoulder issues. He pitched in 39 games and finished the season with a 2.77 ERA and a 4-1 record. He failed to make the Opening Day bullpen in 2013 and opened the season with AAA Sacramento River Cats. On May 8, 2013 he was released to make room on the 40-man roster for Daric Barton.

On August 5, 2013, Norberto agreed to a 50-game suspension for his role in the Biogenesis baseball scandal.

Tampa Bay Rays
Norberto signed a minor league deal with the Tampa Bay Rays in January 2014. He was assigned to the Double-A Montgomery Biscuits on January 22.

Chunichi Dragons

Norberto was signed by the Chunichi Dragons of the NPB to start the 2016 season. Norberto made his first appearance for the Dragons as a relief pitcher but was converted into a starter taking his first win against the Hanshin Tigers on April 15, 2016 in a 6-0 win.

On December 2, 2016 it was announced that Norberto had been released by Chunichi, however by December 23, it was reported that Norberto had been in talks to be re-signed by the Dragons for the 2017 season. It was announced on January 6, 2017 that Norberto had been given a 1-year extension by the Dragons.

Tokyo Yakult Swallows
On December 16, 2017, Norberto signed with the Tokyo Yakult Swallows of Nippon Professional Baseball (NPB). On June 20, 2018 it was announced that he had been placed on waivers. Norberto has since retired from professional baseball.

Post-playing career
In 2020, Norberto joined the Gigantes del Cibao as the team's bullpen coach.

References

External links

1986 births
Living people
Arizona Diamondbacks players
Chunichi Dragons players
Dominican Republic expatriate baseball players in Japan
Dominican Republic expatriate baseball players in the United States
Dominican Republic sportspeople in doping cases
Estrellas Orientales players

Leones del Escogido players
Major League Baseball pitchers
Major League Baseball players from the Dominican Republic
Major League Baseball players suspended for drug offenses
Missoula Osprey players
Mobile BayBears players
Nippon Professional Baseball pitchers
Oakland Athletics players
People from Nagua
Reno Aces players
Sacramento River Cats players
South Bend Silver Hawks players
Visalia Rawhide players